Yevgeniy Natsvin (born September 23, 1985) is a freestyle swimmer from Russia, who won a silver in the men's 4×100 metres freestyle relay event at the 2004 European Championships in Madrid, Spain. He represented his native country at the 2004 Summer Olympics in Athens, Greece, where he was eliminated in the preliminary heats of the 4×200 m freestyle.

References
 

1985 births
Living people
Russian male swimmers
Russian male freestyle swimmers
Olympic swimmers of Russia
Swimmers at the 2004 Summer Olympics
European Aquatics Championships medalists in swimming